was a  after Kōji and before Genki. This period spanned the years from February 1558 through April 1570.

Change of era
 1558 : The era name was changed to mark the enthronement of Emperor Ōgimachi. The previous era ended and a new one commenced in Kōji 4, on the 28th day of the 2nd month.

Events of the Eiroku era
 1560 (Eiroku 3, 1st month): Ōgimachi was proclaimed emperor. The ceremonies of coronation were made possible because they were paid for by Mōri Motonari and others.
 1564 (Eiroku 7): Nobunaga attacked Inabayama Castle in an effort to take Mino Province from the Saitō clan, but was defeated and driven out of Mino. 
 1567 (Eiroku 10, 8th month): Nobunaga defeated the Saito clan, completed the conquest of Mino; and established Gifu Castle as his primary residence and headquarters.
 1568 (Eiroku 11, 2nd month): Ashikaga Yoshihide became shōgun.
 1568 (Eiroku 11, 9th month): Shōgun Yoshihide died from a contagious disease.

Notes

References
 
 Nussbaum, Louis Frédéric and Käthe Roth. (2005). Japan Encyclopedia. Cambridge: Harvard University Press. ; OCLC 48943301
 
 Titsingh, Isaac. (1834). Nihon Ōdai Ichiran; ou,  Annales des empereurs du Japon.  Paris: Royal Asiatic Society, Oriental Translation Fund of Great Britain and Ireland. OCLC 5850691.

External links 
 National Diet Library, "The Japanese Calendar" -- historical overview plus illustrative images from library's collection

Japanese eras
1550s in Japan
1560s in Japan
1570s in Japan